Georgia's 35th Senate District elects one member of the Georgia Senate. Its current representative for 2019–20 is Democrat Donzella James.

References
 

Georgia Senate districts